Mangaldai College, established in 1951,  is an institution and one of the oldest undergraduate, coeducational college situated at Mangaldai in Darrang district, of Assam. This institute was established in the year 1951 with the pioneering effort of late Amiya Bhushan Dasgupta, the then S.D.O.(Civil), mangaldai and many other leading citizens of the district. The prime inspiration of these persons was to materialize the wish of the people for the spread of higher education in the district. The institution had an enthusiastic start under the leadership of the succeeding Principals, dedicated services of the faculty members and other staff contributed immensely to its growth. This college is affiliated with the Gauhati University.

Departments

Science
Physics
Mathematics
Chemistry
Statistics
Computer Science
Botany
Zoology

Arts
Geography
Assamese
English
Bodo
Sanskrit
Arabic
Education
Economics
Philosophy
Political Science
History

B. Voc (Bachelor of Vocational)
Medical Laboratory & Molecular Diagnostic Technology (ML&MDT)
Food Processing Technology

References

External links
http://www.mangaldaicollege.org/index.php

Universities and colleges in Assam
Colleges affiliated to Gauhati University
Educational institutions established in 1951
1951 establishments in Assam